Willingdon Dam is situated to the east of the town of Junagadh, near the foot of Datar hills, in Gujarat State, and built on the Kalwa River in India. The dam was named after Marquess Willingdon, the Governor of India at that time. On the top of adjoining Datar hills is a shrine of Saint Jamiyal Shah Datar, which is a popular place of worship for both Hindus and Muslims.

See also 

 Girnar

References 

Dams in Gujarat
Tourist attractions in Junagadh district
Year of establishment missing